Francis Scott Key Bridge, Key Bridge, or FSK Bridge can refer to:

Francis Scott Key Bridge (Baltimore), a bridge carrying Interstate 695 which crosses the outer harbor of Baltimore, Maryland
Francis Scott Key Bridge (Washington), a bridge carrying U.S. Route 29 which crosses the Potomac River between Washington, DC and Arlington, Virginia